Edward Gregson (born 23 July 1945) is an English composer of instrumental and choral music, particularly for brass and wind bands and ensembles, as well as music for the theatre, film, and television. He was also principal of the Royal Northern College of Music.

Early life and education
He was born in Sunderland, England, in 1945. He studied composition (with Alan Bush) and piano at the Royal Academy of Music from 1963–7, winning five prizes for composition. Although his works have no opus numbers, he referred to his Oboe Sonata as his Opus 1

Career
In 1988 he was nominated for an Ivor Novello award for his title music to BBC Television's Young Musician of the Year programmes, for which he also regularly officiated as a jury member and broadcaster.

He was Principal of the Royal Northern College of Music in Manchester from 1996–2008. There he faced criticism for the appointment of Malcolm Layfield, previously a violin teacher at the College,  to the post of Head of Strings, despite Gregson's knowledge of allegations that Layfield had a history of sexual misconduct against students.

In 2008 he retired from academic life to concentrate on his composition.

He has since completed orchestral commissions for the Royal Liverpool Philharmonic, the Bournemouth Symphony, the Hallé and the BBC Philharmonic orchestras. In 2014, the North American Brass Band Association honored both Edward Gregson and his brother Bramwell Gregson (best known for his conducting work with the London Citadel Band and Canada's Brassroots, modelled on the Philip Jones brass tentet). Each section's required test piece was composed by Edward Gregson.

He continues to sit on a number of Boards relating to music education and the music industry. He is a fellow at the RNCM, as well as at the Royal Academy of Music and the Royal College of Music.

Performances
His music has been performed by many orchestras and ensembles worldwide, including in the UK: the London Symphony Orchestra and all the BBC orchestras; in the USA: Detroit, Louisville and Albany (New York); in the Far East: Tokyo Philharmonic and China National Broadcasting Orchestra; and in Europe: orchestras in France, Germany, the Netherlands, Luxembourg, and Scandinavia.

A major retrospective of his music was held in Manchester in 2002.

Recordings
Chandos have released three complete discs of works by Gregson:
 Trumpet Concerto, Saxophone Concerto, Concerto for piano and wind 
 Blazon, Clarinet Concerto, Violin Concerto, Stepping Out 
 Music for Chamber Orchestra, Trombone Concerto, Two Pictures for String Orchestra, 'A Song for Chris' (Cello Concerto)

Naxos has recorded the complete piano music including the Piano Sonata in one movement, and the two string quartets.

Several CDs of his music for brass have been recorded by various groups on the Doyen label:
 Gregson Volume 1 (DOY CD 017) Desford Colliery Caterpillar Band, circa 1992
Dances and Arias
Concerto for French Horn and Brass Band (w. Frank Lloyd, horn)
Connotations
Of Men and Mountains
 Gregson 2
 Gregson 3
 Gregson 4 The Trumpets of the Angels
 Halle Brass plays Gregson
 Edward Gregson Wind Music
 Gregson 5 Symphony

Works
 1965 – Oboe Sonata
 1966 – In The Beginning
 1967 – Quintet for Brass
 1968 – Music for Chamber Orchestra
 1968 – March Prelude
 1971 – Horn Concerto
 1971 – Horn Concerto (wind ensemble version)
 1971/1999 - Partita (for brass band)
 1976 – Tuba Concerto (orchestral version)
 1976 – Tuba Concerto (brass band version)
 1976 – Tuba Concerto (wind orchestral version)
 1976 - Variations on Laudate Dominum
 1976 - Connotations
 1978 – Flourish for Orchestra
 1979 – Metamorphoses
 1979 – Trombone Concerto
 1982 – Six Little Piano Pieces
 1983 – Contrasts – a concerto for orchestra
 1983 – Equale Dances
 1983 – Piano Sonata in one movement
 1983 – Trumpet Concerto
 1984 – Dances and Arias
 1984 – Sonata for Four Trombones
 1985 – Festivo
 1986 – Occasion
 1987 – Missa Brevis Pacem
 1988 – Make A Joyful Noise
 1992 – Of Men and Mountains
 1994 – Clarinet Concerto
 1997 – A Welcome Ode
 1999 – The Dance, forever the Dance
 1971/1999 - Partita (revision for symphonic wind band)
 2006 – Saxophone Concerto
 2007 – Cello Concerto
 2009 – Dream Song
 2009 – Goddess
 2009 – Tributes
 2011 – An Album for my Friends for piano
 2012 – Symphony in Two Movements
 2014 – String Quartet No 1
 2017 – String Quartet No 2
 2020 – Three Etudes for piano

References

External links 
  with list of works, discography and sound samples
 Edward Gregson's homepage at Novello & Co

1945 births
Living people
British classical composers
English classical composers
People from Sunderland
Musicians from Tyne and Wear
Fellows of the Royal Academy of Music
Alumni of the Royal Academy of Music
Fellows of the Royal College of Music
Academics of the Royal Northern College of Music
20th-century classical composers
21st-century classical composers
English male classical composers
20th-century English composers
21st-century English composers
20th-century British male musicians
21st-century British male musicians